Cerithiopsis perlata is a species of sea snail, a gastropod in the family Cerithiopsidae, which is known from European waters. It was described by Monterosato, in 1889.

References

perlata
Gastropods described in 1889